Kingdom is an anime adaptation of a manga series of the same title written and illustrated by Yasuhisa Hara. It was produced by Pierrot, directed by Jun Kamiya, written by Naruhisa Arakawa, and featured music composed by Minako Seki. The series' characters were designed by Atsuo Tobe, Noriko Otake, and Masatoshi Hakanda. The series premiered from June 4, 2012, to February 25, 2013, and ran for 38 episodes. Funimation announced it acquired the exclusive streaming rights to the series and receive an English dub.

The opening theme is "Pride" by Nothing's Carved in Stone while the ending themes are "Voice of Soul" by Takumi Ishida, "Destiny Sky" by Yūki Wakai, and "Never Ending" by Dasoku.


Episode list

References

2012 Japanese television seasons
2013 Japanese television seasons
Kingdom episode lists